Arthur Weston may refer to:
 Arthur Weston (priest)
 Arthur Weston (scientist)